Sowoneul Malhaebwa may refer to:

 Tell Me Your Wish (Genie), a 2009 extended play by Girls' Generation
 "Tell Me Your Wish (Genie)" (song), the title song
 Make Your Wish, a 2014 South Korean drama series